A Man and His Sin is a Canadian drama film, directed by Paul Gury and released in 1949. Adapted from Claude-Henri Grignon's 1933 novel Un homme et son péché, the film stars Hector Charland as Séraphin Poudrier, the wealthy but miserly mayor of the village of Sainte-Adèle, Quebec, Nicole Germain as Donalda Laloge, a village resident who was given in marriage to Séraphin as payment for a family debt even though she is actually in love with her boyfriend Alexis Labranche (Guy Provost), and Ovila Légaré as the village priest Antoine Labelle.

However, the film did not replicate the plot of the original novel, in which Séraphin's miserliness led directly to Donalda's death; instead, it tells a story in which Séraphin loans Alexis $200 to buy a farm, but then uses his power to prevent Alexis from getting a job to repay him so that Alexis will remain indebted and under Séraphin's control.

The cast also included Henri Poitras, Suzanne Avon, Adjutor Bouré, Eugène Daigneault, Arthur Lefebvre, Armand Leguet, George Alexander, Juliette Béliveau, Julien Lippé, Lucien Martin, Camille Ducharme, Paul Guèvremont, Georges Toupin and Conrad Gauthier.

A sequel film, Séraphin, was released the following year with most of the same cast.

Production
The film had a budget of $137,000.

Response
Producer Paul L'Anglais received a special award "for making a definite advance in Canadian film history" at the 1st Canadian Film Awards in April 1949. At the 2nd Canadian Film Awards the following year, Quebec Productions, the studio of L'Anglais and his business partner René Germain, received a special citation "for sustained and creative effort in establishing a feature-length film industry in Canada", collectively based on the films A Man and His Sin, Séraphin, Whispering City/La Forteresse and The Village Priest (Le Curé du village). 

Quebec film historian Pierre Véronneau later characterized A Man and His Sin, The Village Priest and Séraphin as a group of films about "cowboys in cassocks", which transplanted some of the heroic tropes of Western films onto priests in the church-dominated society of pre-Quiet Revolution Quebec.

References

Works cited

External links
 

1949 films
1940s French-language films
French-language Canadian films
Films set in Quebec
Films shot in Quebec
Canadian black-and-white films
Canadian drama films
1949 drama films
1940s Canadian films
Quebec films